Nancy Ariel Browne (5 September 1913 – 10 October 1996) was a New Zealand cricketer who played primarily as a left-arm medium bowler. She appeared in one Test match for New Zealand, their first, in 1935. She played domestic cricket for Auckland.

References

External links
 
 

1913 births
1996 deaths
Cricketers from Auckland
New Zealand women cricketers
New Zealand women Test cricketers
Auckland Hearts cricketers